Dokdonella  is a genus of bacteria from the family of Rhodanobacteraceae. Dokdonella is named after the island Dokdo.

References

Further reading 
 
 
 </ref>
 

Xanthomonadales
Bacteria genera